Gwaii Haanas National Park Reserve, National Marine Conservation Area, and Haida Heritage Site, usually referred to simply as Gwaii Haanas, is located in southernmost Haida Gwaii (formerly known as Queen Charlotte Islands),  off the mainland of British Columbia, Canada. Gwaii Haanas protects an archipelago of 138 islands, the largest being Moresby Island and the southernmost being Kunghit Island.

The Haida Heritage Site is within the territory of the Haida people, who have lived in Haida Gwaii for at least 14,000 years. Pollen samples indicate trees first arrived 14,500 years ago.

Numerous films have covered Gwaii Haanas, including the 2011 short National Parks Project, directed by Scott Smith and scored by Sarah Harmer, Jim Guthrie and Bry Webb.

Establishing Gwaii Haanas

From the 1970s through the early 1980s, plans to expand logging to Burnaby Island led to controversy, and the first concerted efforts to protect Gwaii Haanas. The "South Moresby Wilderness Proposal" was drawn up in an effort to stem natural resource exploitation.

To prevent logging, the Haida Nation designated the "Haida Heritage Site" in 1985, encompassing roughly the southern third of the archipelago. Importantly, the Heritage site included a swath of land and sea, both terrestrial and marine areas. However, logging continued, amidst legal and political battles. In 1987, logging ended when the governments of Canada and British Columbia signed the South Moresby Memorandum of Understanding.

This accord led to the South Moresby Agreement a year later, which created South Moresby National Park Reserve. It was not a full national park; it was an area reserved to become a national park, because there were outstanding claims to land ownership among federal and tribal governments. But the measure safeguarded the area, and permitted shared stewardship. It would be managed as if it were a national park, pending land claims.

Cooperatively managed

In 1993, the Government of Canada and the Council of the Haida Nation signed the Gwaii Haanas Agreement, which changed the name of the national park reserve to a native name. This Agreement expresses respect for both Canadian and Haida designations and interests, and includes a mutual commitment to the protection of Gwaii Haanas. Because the park reserve and the Haida Heritage Site nearly coincide (on land), its official name reflected both designations: Gwaii Haanas National Park Reserve and Haida Heritage Site.

Based on the Agreement, Gwaii Haanas is cooperatively managed by the Archipelago Management Board (AMB), which is made up of an equal number of representatives from the Council of Haida Nation and the Government of Canada.  The AMB is responsible for all aspects of planning, operation, and management of Gwaii Haanas.

Gwaii Haanas National Marine Conservation Area Reserve 

For the Haida, the marine and terrestrial environments are inseparable. The boundary between earth and ocean exists only on a map. Such is not the case with the park reserve. While the heritage site includes both land and sea, the national park reserve overlaps with only the terrestrial portion of the site. The Gwaii Haanas Agreement provided for native–federal negotiations on managing the marine portion of the site, which eventually bore fruit in 2010 when an enveloping protected area was created. Like the national park reserve it surrounds, the marine reserve is reserved for future designation to full park system status, pending sea claim settlements.

Meantime, the Gwaii Haanas NMCAR will balance protecting marine ecosystems, while also allowing ecolgocially sustainable use.  This includes traditional harvesting, recreational and commercial fishing.

The appearance of "Haida Heritage Site" in both the names of the national park reserve and the marine reserve is a duplication of name, but not of reference. As part of the national park reserve name, it refers to the terrestrial portion of the site. As part of the marine reserve name, it refers to the marine portion of the site. Still, there are areas of the heritage site—both land and sea—which are outside both federal reserves. These are all in the northernmost parts of the site.

Gwaii Haanas National Marine Conservation Area Reserve, which covers 3,400 square kilometres, is "a primary feeding habitat" of the humpback whale (North Pacific population) protected by Canada's Species at Risk Act (SARA).

With the NMCAR established, nearly 5,000 square kilometres of Gwaii Haanas are protected.  This is one of the only places in the world where a representative area is protected from mountain top to ocean depth.

Gwaii Haanas Crest 

The AMB's crest crafted by local Haida artist Giitsxaa represents the unique joint management relationship.  The AMB chose the sea otter and the sea urchin because of the creatures' significance in the history and tradition of the protected area and because of their ecological significance.

Populations of sea urchin, a kelp-grazing species, were once kept in check by sea otters, ensuring an abundance of kelp and species that depend upon kelp communities.  With the extirpation of sea otters during the Maritime Fur Trade, the natural balance between species in the community was disturbed. As a result, the sea urchin population has increased dramatically over time and the health of kelp forests is threatened.  The loss of the sea otter is a powerful reminder of the vulnerability of individual species and entire ecosystems.

World Heritage and National Historic Site Haida Village

The remains of a Haida village on the eastern side of the island —  — represent an outstanding example of a traditional Northwest Coast First Nations village site, complete with standing totem poles and the remains of cedar longhouses.

Between two and four Watchmen live at each site serving as guardians to protect the natural and cultural heritage of these sites.

Other historical villages within the boundaries of Gwaii Haanas included Cumshewa, Clew (Tanu) and Djí-gua.

Potential expansion 
In 2004, Parks Canada, on behalf of the Government of Canada, added the entirety of Gwaii Haanas to its tentative list of potential future World Heritage Sites, pending approval by UNESCO.

Ecology

Terrain and climate
The landscapes of Gwaii Haanas vary from deep fjords to rugged mountains, salmon spawning streams to sub-alpine tundra.  Close to 90% of Gwaii Haanas is forested, 9% is alpine and sub-alpine tundra.  The remaining 1% is made up of lakes and wetlands.

As water drains from the highest mountains - including the rugged San Christoval Range with peaks over  - it helps fill over 40 freshwater lakes. In turn, this water drains through more than 100 salmon spawning streams.

The reserve includes the Hotspring Island, with a hot spring.

A small off the grid community located in Rose Harbour, Kunghit Island is thriving on the only private piece of land in the Southern Gwaii Haanas area. The community's economy is mostly based on small scale ecotourism where it is possible to find accommodation, meals, guides and sea kayaking. Rose Harbour property was until the 1940s an important whaling station off the North Coast of British Columbia.

Flora
Extreme exposure to wind and rain makes the forests on the west coast boggy and stunted, and are dominated by western red cedar and hemlock . Forests of the leeward, or eastern side of Gwaii Haanas, are classic coastal temperate rainforests, dominant overstorey species include large western hemlock, Sitka spruce and western red cedar trees.

Fauna
Distinct island flora and fauna have evolved over thousands of years.  Species here often differ from those found on the mainland.  Many common continental species are not found on the islands, or have evolved into unique subspecies such as the black bear which is larger than its mainland cousin.  Other species have been introduced relatively recently, such as the Sitka deer, ermine, raccoon, squirrel and beaver. Introduced species now exist in large numbers, much to the detriment of native plants and animals.

An estimated 750,000 seabirds nest along the shoreline of Gwaii Haanas from May through August. Many are burrow-nesters, such as the rhinoceros auklet, ancient murrelet and tufted puffin.  Bald eagles are a common sight and nest along the coastline.  Because the islands are situated along the Pacific flyway, dozens of species of migrating birds stop here in spring and fall.

Access
Gwaii Haanas came first in a survey of US and Canadian National Parks in National Geographic Traveler magazine, recognized for its pristine environment and sustainable management practices.

Gwaii Haanas is a remote location, accessible by sea kayak, boat or chartered floatplane only.

An orientation is provided to all visitors before they enter Gwaii Haanas.

See also

List of National Parks of Canada
National Parks of Canada

Affiliations
The museum is affiliated with: CMA,  CHIN, and Virtual Museum of Canada.

References

External links

World Heritage Site

Further reading
 "MacDonald, George F." Ninstints – Haida World Heritage Site. Vancouver: UBC Press. 1983

National parks in British Columbia
Parks in British Columbia
World Heritage Sites in Canada
Heritage sites in British Columbia
Old-growth forests
Haida
Ruins in Canada
Geography of Haida Gwaii
Protected areas established in 1998
Co-managed protected areas